José María de Miguel Gil (born 1950) is a Spanish politician and former President of La Rioja between 1983 and 1987.

References

Presidents of La Rioja (Spain)
1950 births
Living people
Members of the 2nd Senate of Spain
Spanish Socialist Workers' Party politicians
People from Logroño